Lehinch (An Leithinse in Irish) is a townland in the barony of Ormond Lower, County Tipperary in Ireland. It is located east of Portumna bridge, in the civil parish of Lorrha.

References

Townlands of County Tipperary
Populated places on the River Shannon